Attelabus is a genus of weevils belonging to the family Attelabidae.

Species
These species are members of the genus Attelabus, found in Europe.

 Attelabus abdominalis Angelov, 1964
 Attelabus abyssinicus Hustache, 1923
 Attelabus aeneus 
 Attelabus aequatus 
 Attelabus algoensis Mshl., 1906
 Attelabus alliariae Fabricius & J.C., 1801
 Attelabus alvearius Turton, 1802
 Attelabus amitinus Voss, 1932
 Attelabus ammios 
 Attelabus amplectens Mannerheim, 1833
 Attelabus angulatus 
 Attelabus angulipennis Sharp, 1889
 Attelabus angulosus Gyllenhal, 1833
 Attelabus anserinus Gyllenhal, 1833
 Attelabus armatus Gyllenhal, 1833
 Attelabus asparagi 
 Attelabus asperipennis Fairm., 1898
 Attelabus astragali 
 Attelabus ater 
 Attelabus atratus Fabricius & J.C., 1801
 Attelabus atricornis Muls., 1855
 Attelabus atrirostris Fabricius & J.C., 1802
 Attelabus auratus 
 Attelabus aureolus Gyllenhal, 1833
 Attelabus avellanae 
 Attelabus axillaris 
 Attelabus azureus Olivier, 1807
 Attelabus bacchus 
 Attelabus badius Say
 Attelabus balcanicus 
 Attelabus betuleti 
 Attelabus bicolor Gmelin & J.F., 1790
 Attelabus bicoloratus Turton, 1802
 Attelabus bifasciatus 
 Attelabus bifoveatus Jekel, 1860
 Attelabus biguttatus Fabricius & J.C., 1801
 Attelabus bihastatus Frivaldszky, 1892
 Attelabus bimaculatus 
 Attelabus binotatus 
 Attelabus bipustulatus 
 Attelabus bipustulosus Jekel, 1860
 Attelabus breviceps Sharp, 1889
 Attelabus brevicollis Sharp, 1889
 Attelabus bullatus Sharp, 1889
 Attelabus buqueti Jekel, 1860
 Attelabus calibatus R.Townson, 1797
 Attelabus callosus Sharp, 1889
 Attelabus canaliculatus 
 Attelabus carbonicolor Voss, 1927
 Attelabus carneolus 
 Attelabus castaneicolor Jekel, 1860
 Attelabus chalybaeus 
 Attelabus championi Sharp, 1889
 Attelabus christophi 
 Attelabus chrysidius Pascoe, 1886
 Attelabus cicatricosus Motsch., 1860
 Attelabus ciodes 
 Attelabus coccineus 
 Attelabus coccolobae Wolcott, 1924
 Attelabus coeruleocephalus Panzer, 1805
 Attelabus coeruleus 
 Attelabus columbinus Erichson, 1848
 Attelabus concolor Leoni, 1905
 Attelabus conicollis Sharp, 1889
 Attelabus conicus Illiger, 1807
 Attelabus constrictipennis Chittenden, 1926
 Attelabus coquereli Fairm., 1871
 Attelabus corallinus Gyllenhal, 1839
 Attelabus corallipes Pascoe, 1883
 Attelabus corniculatus 
 Attelabus corvinus 
 Attelabus costipennis Fahrs., 1871
 Attelabus costulatus Jekel, 1860
 Attelabus crabroniformis 
 Attelabus craccae 
 Attelabus cribrarius Olivier, 1807
 Attelabus cribricollis Jekel, 1860
 Attelabus crotalariae Fabricius & J.C., 1801
 Attelabus cruralis Sharp, 1889
 Attelabus cupreus 
 Attelabus cupricollis 
 Attelabus cupripennis Perty, 1832
 Attelabus cuprirostris Fabricius & J.C., 1801
 Attelabus curculioniformis Dalla Torre & Voss, 1930
 Attelabus curculionoides 
 Attelabus cyaenus 
 Attelabus cyanellus Voss, 1925
 Attelabus cyaneoviridis Hustache, 1923
 Attelabus cyaneus 
 Attelabus cyanipennis Jekel, 1860
 Attelabus cygneus Fabricius & J.C., 1801
 Attelabus cylindricus Stephens, 1831
 Attelabus dajacus Heller, 1922
 Attelabus dauricus 
 Attelabus deceptor Jekel, 1860
 Attelabus dejardinii Guérin-Méneville
 Attelabus deletangi Hustache, 1924
 Attelabus denigratus 
 Attelabus dentipennis 
 Attelabus dentipes 
 Attelabus diffinis Sharp, 1889
 Attelabus discolor 
 Attelabus disparipes Chittenden, 1926
 Attelabus distinctus Sharp, 1889
 Attelabus dorsalis Dejean, 1821
 Attelabus dromedarius Faust, 1883
 Attelabus dubius 
 Attelabus duodecimpunctatus 
 Attelabus durus 
 Attelabus efferans R.Townson, 1797
 Attelabus elongaticeps Voss, 1924
 Attelabus erythropterus 
 Attelabus exaratus 
 Attelabus falcata Jekel, 1860
 Attelabus falcatus Guérin-Méneville, 1833
 Attelabus falcipes Klug, 1825
 Attelabus fasciatus 
 Attelabus fascicollis Reitter, 1916
 Attelabus feae Faust, 1894
 Attelabus femoralis 
 Attelabus femoratus Olivier, 1807
 Attelabus fenestratus Sharp, 1889
 Attelabus flavicornis Fabricius & J.C., 1801
 Attelabus flavipes 
 Attelabus formicaroides 
 Attelabus fornicatus Olivier, 1807
 Attelabus fossor 
 Attelabus foveicollis Dallas, 1867
 Attelabus foveipennis 
 Attelabus foveolatus Gyllenhal, 1833
 Attelabus frumentarius 
 Attelabus fulvitarsis Jekel, 1860
 Attelabus funereus L.Ponza, 1805
 Attelabus fuscicornis 
 Attelabus fuscirostris 
 Attelabus gemmatus 
 Attelabus genalis J.L.Leconte, 1876
 Attelabus geoffroyanus 
 Attelabus gestroi Faust, 1894
 Attelabus giganteus Faust, 1882
 Attelabus glaber 
 Attelabus globosus 
 Attelabus gnomoides White, 1841
 Attelabus hamatus Olivier, 1807
 Attelabus heterocerus Sharp, 1889
 Attelabus hirtus Fabricius & J.C., 1801
 Attelabus hispanicus Jekel, 1860
 Attelabus holosericeus Dejean
 Attelabus humeralis Klug, 1825
 Attelabus humerosus Faust, 1894
 Attelabus hungaricus Fabricius & J.C., 1802
 Attelabus hypomelas Fairm., 1878
 Attelabus hystrix Fabricius & J.C., 1801
 Attelabus ichneumonius 
 Attelabus ignitus Schoenherr, 1826
 Attelabus ilicis Costa, 1839
 Attelabus inaequalis Sharp, 1889
 Attelabus indicus 
 Attelabus indigaceus Pascoe, 1883
 Attelabus intermedius 
 Attelabus ircutensis 
 Attelabus jekeli Kirsch, 1870
 Attelabus klugi Gyll.In Schonherr, 1839
 Attelabus klugii 
 Attelabus lacertosus Marshall, 1923
 Attelabus laesicollis 
 Attelabus laetus Cristofori & Jan, 1832
 Attelabus lepturoides Illiger
 Attelabus lewisi Sharp, 1889
 Attelabus ligulatus Sharp, 1889
 Attelabus lineaticollis Dejean, 1830
 Attelabus lizeri Hustache, 1924
 Attelabus longiclava Sharp, 1889
 Attelabus longicollis 
 Attelabus longimanus 
 Attelabus longirostris Jekel, 1860
 Attelabus lythri Panzer, 1794
 Attelabus maculatus 
 Attelabus maculipes Villa & Villa, 1833
 Attelabus malaccensis Heller, 1922
 Attelabus malvae 
 Attelabus marci 
 Attelabus marginalis Pic, 1916
 Attelabus marginatus 
 Attelabus melancoryphus Germar, 1824
 Attelabus melanocephalus Dejean, 1821
 Attelabus melanocoryphus Jekel, 1860
 Attelabus melanopygus Sharp, 1889
 Attelabus melanurus 
 Attelabus monoceros 
 Attelabus morio Jekel, 1860
 Attelabus mundanus Sharp, 1889
 Attelabus munroi Marshall, 1932
 Attelabus mutabilis Jekel, 1860
 Attelabus mutillarius 
 Attelabus mutus 
 Attelabus nanus 
 Attelabus nigriclava Sharp, 1889
 Attelabus nigricornis Klug, 1825
 Attelabus nigripennis 
 Attelabus nigripes 
 Attelabus nigrirostris 
 Attelabus nigriventris Schilsky, 1906
 Attelabus nitens Voss, 1925
 Attelabus nitensiformis Kono, 1927
 Attelabus nitidus Jekel, 1860
 Attelabus notatus 
 Attelabus nourricheli Leoni, 1905
 Attelabus obliquus Heller, 1908
 Attelabus obscurior Pic, 1898
 Attelabus obsidianus Voss, 1925
 Attelabus octomaculatus 
 Attelabus octopunctatus 
 Attelabus octospilotus Jekel, 1860
 Attelabus ovalis F.Weber, 1801
 Attelabus ovatus Fabricius & J.C., 1801
 Attelabus palliatus Leoni, 1905
 Attelabus pectoralis Thunberg, 1813
 Attelabus perrieri Fairm., 1898
 Attelabus piceovirens Jekel, 1860
 Attelabus pisi Fabricius & J.C., 1801
 Attelabus placidus Jekel, 1860
 Attelabus planirostris Fabricius & J.C., 1801
 Attelabus polita Roelofs, 1874
 Attelabus politus Gebler, 1825
 Attelabus polymorphus 
 Attelabus pomonae 
 Attelabus populi 
 Attelabus pseudosuturalis Ter-Minasian, 1952
 Attelabus pubescens 
 Attelabus pulchellus Suffr., 1870
 Attelabus pulvinicollis Jekel, 1860
 Attelabus punctatostriata Motsch., 1860
 Attelabus punctatus Olivier, 1807
 Attelabus punctiger 
 Attelabus purpureus 
 Attelabus pustula Ancey, 1881
 Attelabus quadratus Sharp, 1889
 Attelabus quadrimaculatus 
 Attelabus quadripustulatus Fabricius & J.C., 1801
 Attelabus quadrispinosus 
 Attelabus regularis Faust, 1883
 Attelabus rhinomacer Ill., 1805
 Attelabus rhois 
 Attelabus rostratus 
 Attelabus rubricollis Reitter, 1916
 Attelabus rubrodorsatus Fairm., 1898
 Attelabus rudis 
 Attelabus rufescens Dejean, 1830
 Attelabus ruficollis 
 Attelabus rufipennis Sharp, 1889
 Attelabus rufipes Schilsky, 1903
 Attelabus rufirostris 
 Attelabus rufus Fabricius & J.C., 1801
 Attelabus rugicollis Jekel, 1860
 Attelabus ruginotus Fairm., 1899
 Attelabus sandacanus Heller, 1922
 Attelabus sanguineus 
 Attelabus sanguinipennis Hope
 Attelabus schaefferi 
 Attelabus scutellaris Say, 1826
 Attelabus scutellatus Gyllenhal, 1833
 Attelabus sedatus Sharp, 1889
 Attelabus sellatus 
 Attelabus senex Pallas, 1773
 Attelabus serraticornis 
 Attelabus serripes Germar
 Attelabus sexguttatus 
 Attelabus sexmaculatus Chevr., 1876
 Attelabus sexplagiatus Heller, 1922
 Attelabus similis Kirby, 1837
 Attelabus simulatus Marshall, 1923
 Attelabus smeraldinus Costa, 1827
 Attelabus smithi Sharp, 1889
 Attelabus sorbi 
 Attelabus speciosus 
 Attelabus spectator Marshall, 1932
 Attelabus sphageus 
 Attelabus spiculatus Auriv., 1891
 Attelabus spinicollis Dejean, 1821
 Attelabus spinifex Olivier, 1807
 Attelabus spinipes Schilsky, 1906
 Attelabus spinosus 
 Attelabus splendens 
 Attelabus striatus Klug
 Attelabus subcyaneus Voss, 1931
 Attelabus sulcifrons 
 Attelabus sumptuosus Gory, 1834
 Attelabus surinamensis 
 Attelabus suturalis Voss, 1925
 Attelabus tranquebaricus 
 Attelabus trapezicollis Heller, 1922
 Attelabus tricolor Kirsch, 1874
 Attelabus tristis 
 Attelabus troglodytes Jekel, 1860
 Attelabus tuberculosus Fahrs., 1871
 Attelabus tuberifer Jekel, 1860
 Attelabus unicolor 
 Attelabus unifasciatus 
 Attelabus uniformis Heller, 1908
 Attelabus variabilis 
 Attelabus variegatus Dejean, 1830
 Attelabus variolosus Fabricius & J.C., 1802
 Attelabus vernalis 
 Attelabus verrucifer Jekel, 1860
 Attelabus versicolor Costa, 1839
 Attelabus vestitus 
 Attelabus viciae 
 Attelabus vinosus Sharp, 1889
 Attelabus violaceus Jekel, 1860
 Attelabus viridans Gyllenhal, 1839
 Attelabus wagneri Hustache, 1926

References

 Bisby F.A., Roskov Y.R., Orrell T.M., Nicolson D., Paglinawan L.E., Bailly N., Kirk P.M., Bourgoin T., Baillargeon G., Ouvrard D. (red.) (2011)  Catalogue of Life
 Biolib

Attelabidae
Articles containing video clips
Beetle genera